McSharry is a surname. Notable people with the surname include:

Andy "The Bull" McSharry, Irish sheep farmer
Carmel McSharry (1926–2018), Irish actor
Dave McSharry (born 1990), Irish rugby union player
Mona McSharry (born 2000), Irish swimmer